The DTM Trophy is a sports car racing series sanctioned by ITR e.V. who have been affiliated to the DMSB-FIA since 1984. The series is based in Germany, with rounds elsewhere in Europe, racing a mass-produced GT4 racing cars since 2020.

DTM Trophy is currently de facto support series for Deutsche Tourenwagen Masters for GT cars eligible for E2-SH and E2-SC-class FIA categories.

History
On 20 October 2019 it was announced that the ITR e.V. sanctioning body would create the GT4-based sports car racing series, with plans to debut in 2020. On the same date ITR e.V. announced that DTM Trophy would be introduced and thus would be scheduled to debut from 2020 season onwards.

Cars
DTM Trophy cars format are utilizing GT4-based mass-produced sports car racing since 2020 season.

Tyres
On 30 December 2019 it was announced that South Korean tyre manufacturer Hankook Tire would be selected as official tyre partner beginning from 2020 until at least 2023 season.

Manufacturer representation
 Aston Martin Vantage AMR GT4 (2021–present)
 Audi R8 LMS GT4 Evo (2020–present)
 BMW M4 GT4 (2020–present)
 Mercedes-AMG GT4 (2020–present)
 Porsche 718 Cayman GT4 Clubsport (2020, 2022–present)
 Porsche Cayman PRO4 GT4 (2020–2021)
 KTM X-Bow GT4 (2020–2021)
 Toyota GR Supra GT4 (2020–present)

Race format

Scoring system 
Points were awarded to the top ten classified finishers as follows:

Additionally, the top three placed drivers in qualifying also received points:

If in the case of a tie, DTM Trophy will determine the champion based on the most first-place finishes. If there is still a tie, DTM Trophy will determine the champion by the most second-place finishes, then the most third-place finishes, etc., until a champion is determined. DTM Trophy will apply the same system to other ties in the rankings at the close of the season and at any other time during the season.

Seasons

See also
 Deutsche Tourenwagen Masters

References

External links
 Official website of the DTM Trophy
 
Sports car racing series
Auto racing series in Germany
Recurring sporting events established in 2020
GT4 (sports car class)